Lucy Tarr Mansion, also known as "Highland Place" and Nellie Little House, is a historic home located at Wellsburg, Brooke County, West Virginia. It was built in 1885, and is a -story brick dwelling with highly pitched roofs and richly appointed porches in the Queen Anne style.  It features a three-story tower with a pyramidal roof covered in fishscale slate.  It also has a one-story, ell shaped verandah with turned columns.  Also on the property is a contributing barn / garage.

It was listed on the National Register of Historic Places in 1986.

Gallery

References

Houses on the National Register of Historic Places in West Virginia
Queen Anne architecture in West Virginia
Houses completed in 1885
Houses in Brooke County, West Virginia
National Register of Historic Places in Brooke County, West Virginia